1635 Bohrmann, provisional designation , is a stony Koronian asteroid from the outer region of the asteroid belt, approximately 17 kilometers in diameter. It was discovered on 7 March 1924, by German astronomer Karl Reinmuth at Heidelberg Observatory in southern Germany, and named for astronomer Alfred Bohrmann.

Orbit and classification 

The stony S-type asteroid belongs to the Koronis family, a group consisting of few hundred known bodies with nearly ecliptical orbits. It orbits the Sun in the outer main-belt at a distance of 2.7–3.0 AU once every 4 years and 10 months (1,761 days). Its orbit has an eccentricity of 0.06 and an inclination of 2° with respect to the ecliptic.

As no precoveries were taken, Bohrmanns observation arc begins with the first used observation taken on the night following its discovery.

Diameter and albedo 

According to the surveys carried out by the Japanese Akari satellite and NASA's Wide-field Infrared Survey Explorer with its subsequent NEOWISE mission, Bohrmann measures between 16.6 and 19.1 kilometers in diameter, and its surface has an albedo between 0.187 and 0.255. The Collaborative Asteroid Lightcurve Link assumes a standard albedo for members of the Koronian family of 0.24, and calculates a diameter of 17.1 kilometers with an absolute magnitude of 11.0.

Lightcurves 

In September and October 2003, four rotational lightcurves were obtained for this asteroid from photometric observations at several observatories around the world, including the Whitin Observatory in Wellesley, Massachusetts, as well as by U.S. astronomers Robert Stephens and Brian Warner. The lightcurves gave two different solutions for the Bohrmanns rotation period. One solution gave  and  hours, while the alternative solution gave  and  hours. The lightcurves had a concurring brightness variation of 0.25 in magnitude.

Naming 

This minor planet was named after German astronomer Alfred Bohrmann (1904–2000), a long-time observer of minor planets at the discovering Heidelberg Observatory and a discoverer of minor planets himself. During his career he had published several hundreds of precise observations of asteroids. The official  was published by the Minor Planet Center on 20 February 1976.

References

External links 
 Lightcurve plot of 1635 Bohrmann, Palmer Divide Observatory, B. D. Warner (2003)
 Asteroid Lightcurve Database (LCDB), query form (info )
 Dictionary of Minor Planet Names, Google books
 Asteroids and comets rotation curves, CdR – Observatoire de Genève, Raoul Behrend
 Discovery Circumstances: Numbered Minor Planets (1)-(5000) – Minor Planet Center
 
 

 

001635
Discoveries by Karl Wilhelm Reinmuth
Named minor planets
001635
19240307